Gaffel Becker & Co is a brewery founded in 1908 by the Becker Brothers in Cologne. It produces a traditional regional style top-fermented beer called  Gaffel Kölsch.

References

Breweries in Germany
Beer brands of Germany
Food and drink companies established in 1908
Manufacturing companies based in Cologne
German companies established in 1908